Gus Heinze (born May 1, 1926 in Bremen, Germany) is an American photorealist painter.

Early work
From 1947-1950, Heinze studied under Robert Weaver, Howard Trafton, and Robert Ward Johnson at the School of Visual Arts and the Art Students League in New York.
During the 1950s and 1960s he worked as a freelance commercial artist on Madison Avenue. In 1970 he began his career as a photorealist painter in Bondville, Vermont; many of his paintings from this period depict parts of automobiles and motorcycles in close-up.

"Abstract realism"

In 1978 Heinze relocated to Marin County, California, and began exploring more diverse subjects. He increasingly moved toward storefront-window and city scenes, in a style that he calls "abstract realism,"
where the subject is real but the point of view and composition give the painting an abstract quality — resulting in a kind of reverse trompe-l'œil. As his works can appear half-real, half-abstract, it is not surprising that the artist himself describes abstract realism as "a total oxymoron."

In addition to his urban subjects, Heinze has also painted dilapidated farm equipment such as tractors and water pumps, and old trains and locomotive engines; in Exactitude: Hyperrealist Art Today, John Russell Taylor writes that "Heinze is fascinated by decaying machinery left behind as the detritus of the Industrial Revolution. The forms are powerful, if inscrutable." He has also done series of paintings depicting rocky cliffsides, vineyard grapes, and streams; much of his subject matter is characterized by complex reflections off glass or water, intricate foliage, and deep background blacks with saturated colors in the foreground. In Photorealism at the Millennium, Louis K. Meisel writes that Heinze "has not settled into any particular subject matter or point of view. This makes his work less distinctive and recognizable than that of other photorealists, but it also provides him with an added degree of freedom."

Heinze's paintings have been featured in the books The Martini and The Cigar, both by Barnaby Conrad III.
In 1999 he began collaborating with Magnolia Editions to produce lithographic reproductions.

Solo exhibitions since 1995

 2011 — Bernarducci.Meisel.Gallery, New York
 2009 — Bernarducci.Meisel.Gallery, New York
 2006 — Bernarducci.Meisel.Gallery, New York
 2004 — David Klein Gallery, Birmingham, Michigan
 2004 — Plus One Gallery, London, UK
 2004 — Bernarducci.Meisel.Gallery, New York
 2003 — Modernism, San Francisco
 2002 — Bernarducci.Meisel.Gallery, New York
 1999 — Mendenhall Gallery, Pasadena, California
 1998 — Modernism, San Francisco
 1997 — Mendenhall Gallery, Pasadena, California
 1996 — Modernism, San Francisco
 1995 — Galerie Redman, Berlin, Germany

Group exhibitions since 2005

 2010 — "Expansion," Bernarducci.Meisel.Gallery, New York
 2008 — "Contemporary American Realism: 2008 Biennial," Fort Wayne Museum of Art, Fort Wayne, Indiana
 2008 — "Unforeseen Reflections," Bernarducci.Meisel.Gallery, New York
 2008 — "SPF 20 — Shades of Summer," Bernarducci.Meisel.Gallery, New York
 2007 — "Culinary Arts," Bernarducci.Meisel.Gallery, New York
 2007 — "Structure," Bernarducci.Meisel.Gallery, New York
 2006 — "Summer Suite," Bernarducci.Meisel.Gallery, New York
 2005-6 — "Majestic Tapestries of Magnolia Editions," Bedford Gallery, Walnut Creek, California
 2005 — "Contemporary American Realism VIII," MA Doran Gallery, Tulsa, Oklahoma
 2005 — "Personal Places," Bernarducci.Meisel.Gallery, New York
 2005 — "Winter in Blue," Bernarducci.Meisel.Gallery, New York
 2005 — "Industrial Landscapes in Contemporary Painting," Bernarducci.Meisel.Gallery, New York
 2005 — "21st Century Realism," General Electric Company Corporate Art Program, Fairfield, Connecticut

Selected public collections

 Allergan Pharmaceuticals, Los Angeles
 Bank of America World Headquarters, San Francisco
 Chase Manhattan Bank, New York
 Dreyer's Grand Ice Cream, Oakland, California
 Dean Witter Reynolds, San Francisco
 GTE Corporation, Thousand Oaks, California
 Hughes Aircraft Corporation, Los Angeles
 Kaiser Permanente, Fontana, California
 Transamerica Corporation, Los Angeles

References

External links
 "Gus Heinze: Means of Entry" at Bernarducci.Meisel.Gallery
 Gus Heinze at Modernism
 Magnolia Editions: Gus Heinze (lithographs)
 Gus Heinze on Artnet.com

1926 births
20th-century American painters
American male painters
21st-century American painters
Living people
Photorealist artists
German emigrants to the United States
20th-century American male artists